Matthew Gould (born 7 January 1994) is a professional footballer who plays as a goalkeeper for Altrincham. Born in England, he has been called up to the New Zealand national team.

Club career
In September 2014, after four appearances for Hawke's Bay United in the New Zealand Football Championship, Gould signed for Cheltenham Town in EFL League Two. After a loan spell at Bishop's Cleeve, Gould signed for Livingston in 2015 but did not make an appearance for the first team. In 2016 after loan spells at Stenhousemuir and Stourbridge, Gould signed on to stay with Stourbridge playing in the Northern Premier League Premier Division. Gould help the club make the third round of the FA Cup after beating Northampton Town, who at the time were four divisions higher than Stourbridge, 1–0. They would lose to Wycombe Wanderers 2–1 in the next round. After playing in 138 games for the club, Gould left in 2018. On 16 August 2020, Gould signed with Altrincham. In 2021, after not appearing for Altrincham, Gould was loaned out to Nantwich Town for three months. On the 23 May 2022, Gould signed an extension with Altrincham where he would not only try to compete for the starting spot, but hold a dual role as the first-teams keeper coach after completing his UEFA qualifications.

International career
In January 2022, he was named in the New Zealand national team senior squad for two matches in Abu Dhabi and Dubai.

Personal life
Gould is the son of former Celtic player and current goalkeeping coach, Jonathan Gould, nephew of Richard Gould and grandson of former Wimbledon manager Bobby Gould.

References

1994 births
Living people
People from Warwick
New Zealand association footballers
English footballers
New Zealand people of Scottish descent
New Zealand people of English descent
English people of Scottish descent
English emigrants to New Zealand
New Zealand expatriate sportspeople in England
Association football goalkeepers
Scottish Football League players
Hawke's Bay United FC players
Cheltenham Town F.C. players
Bishop's Cleeve F.C. players
Livingston F.C. players
Stenhousemuir F.C. players
Stourbridge F.C. players
Spennymoor Town F.C. players
Altrincham F.C. players
Nantwich Town F.C. players